

Dinosaurs

Newly named dinosaurs

See also

References

1830s in paleontology
Paleontology